Teddy Tandjung (born 20 February 1973) is an Indonesian former professional tennis player.

Tandjung, a native of Palembang, played college tennis for the University of Central Florida and featured on the professional tour during the 1990s.

Competing in multi-sport events, Tandjung won three bronze medals for Indonesia at the 1993 Southeast Asian Games in Singapore and a further bronze medal at the 1994 Asian Games in Hiroshima.

In 1995 he appeared in two Davis Cup ties for his country, partnering Donny Susetyo in doubles rubbers against South Korea and Chinese Taipei, for a loss and a win respectively.

See also
List of Indonesia Davis Cup team representatives

References

External links
 
 
 

1973 births
Living people
Indonesian male tennis players
People from Palembang
UCF Knights men's tennis players
Competitors at the 1993 Southeast Asian Games
Southeast Asian Games medalists in tennis
Southeast Asian Games bronze medalists for Indonesia
Tennis players at the 1994 Asian Games
Medalists at the 1994 Asian Games
Asian Games bronze medalists for Indonesia
Asian Games medalists in tennis
20th-century Indonesian people
21st-century Indonesian people